Oneeke (also Oneaka) is the smaller of the two islands which form Kuria in the North Gilbert Islands. It is separated from Buariki, the larger island, by a narrow channel. A fringing reef extends from the island.

References

Islands of Oceania